Kang Hang (1567–1618) was a Korean scholar who was taken prisoner by the forces of Toyotomi Hideyoshi in 1597.  He was taken to Japan where he was influential in passing on neo-Confucianist ideas to the people of Japan.

References

Korean scholars
Neo-Confucian scholars
1567 births
1618 deaths
People of the Japanese invasions of Korea (1592–1598)